The Camino, Placerville and Lake Tahoe Railroad   was an  Class III short-line railroad operating in the Sierra Nevada in California, east of Sacramento. It was built primarily to haul lumber from the El Dorado National Forest. The standard gauge line ran west  from a sawmill at Camino to a connection with the Placerville Branch of the Southern Pacific Company at Placerville.

History
The CPLT's history starts in 1903 with its predecessor, the Placerville and Lake Tahoe Railway.  The Placerville & Lake Tahoe Railway started grading on or about September 15, 1903.  On April 11, 1904, the Placerville and Lake Tahoe was incorporated and the line was opened that same year.  At Camino, the Placerville & Lake Tahoe went to narrow-gauge (operated as the El Dorado Lumber Company Narrow Gauge Lines) where it extended another  into the forest in the area of Old Pino, Pino Grande and Pilot Creek (Tallac).  From 1910-1911 the Placerville and Lake Tahoe did not operate.  In 1911 the Placerville and Lake Tahoe was sold at foreclosure for $62,714.58 and was reorganized on December 28, 1911 as the Camino, Placerville and Lake Tahoe Railroad.

The CPLT was owned by the Michigan-California Lumber Company.  In 1986 the Southern Pacific abandoned the Placerville Branch, eliminating CPLT's access to the national rail network.  Scrapping of the CPLT commenced on September 3, 1986.

Other railroads operating in the narrow gauge forest were the American River Land and Lumber Company, that built a line through the forest in 1892. In 1917, the El Dorado Lumber Company was sold to the Michigan-California Lumber Company.

Chart of History of Area Lines

Standard Gauge 8 mile line
Camino, Placerville and Lake Tahoe Railroad 1911-1986 Standard Gauge 8 miles (Owned by Michigan-California Lumber)
Placerville and Lake Tahoe Railway — Standard & Narrow Gauge 1904-1911
Locomotives

Narrow Gauge 50 mile line
From Camino — Pino Grande.
Michigan-California Lumber Company 1917-1951 (later abandoned)
El Dorado Lumber Company 1901-1917 (34 miles)
American River Land and Lumber Company 1982-1901 Mill-timber
R.E. Danaher Lumber Company / C.D. Danaher Pine Company 1911-1915 Pino Grande-Pilot Creek (15 miles)

Sources

Notes

Defunct California railroads
Logging railroads in the United States
Eldorado National Forest
History of the Sierra Nevada (United States)
Placerville, California